IRLB may refer to:

Imperial Rugby League Board, defunct rugby league football governing body
International Rugby League Board, defunct rugby league football governing body